Thai Square is a UK restaurant chain with 15 Thai-themed restaurants in London and south-east England. It was founded in 1996 when the first branch opened on The Strand in central London. Their Trafalgar Square location seats 500 and claims to be the largest Thai restaurant in central London.

References

Thai restaurants
Restaurant groups in the United Kingdom
Restaurants established in 1996